RMAF Kuching is an air force base operated by the Royal Malaysian Air Force. It is located in Kuching, Sarawak in East Malaysia and colocated with the Kuching International Airport.

History

RMAF Kuching was established in 1964 by the Royal Air Force during the Indonesia–Malaysia confrontation to strengthen defense in Sarawak. RMAF formed a small detachment to assist RAF with the stationed of 20 personnel with one Twin Pioneer and four Aérospatiale Alouette III in August 1966. In 1967 RMAF Kuching was officially inaugurated after the RAF handed over the base to the RMAF following the withdrawal of the RAF elements in RMAF Kuching. Since then, RMAF Kuching have seen the significant development by the arrival of new aircraft such as DHC-4 Caribou and Sikorsky SH-3 Sea King and also the formation of new squadron.

See also

 Royal Malaysian Air Force bases
 List of airports in Malaysia

References

Airports in Sarawak